Bismil is a district of Diyarbakır Province of Turkey. The population is 117,674 (as of 2018) and most of the people are Kurds.

Location 
In order to settle the influx of migrants from Konya in 1936, a new district of Diyarbakir was established. It is a South-Eastern Anatolia region of Turkey and is located to the east of the Diyarbakir province. The area of this district is 1748 km2. Geographically it is situated 550 meters above the sea level. The town features numerous parks. On the Körtik hill exists an archeological site.

Politics 
In the elections on the 31 March 2019 Orhan Ayaz from the Peoples' Democratic Party was elected as Mayor. But in October he got dismissed due to an investigation. A trustee was appointed instead.

Neighbourhoods

Ahmetli 
Akbaş 
Akköy 
Akoba  
Akçay 
Alibey 
Aluç 
Alıncak  
Ambar 
Aralık 
Arıkgöl  
Aslanoğlu
Ataköy 
Aygeçti  
Ağılköy 
Ağıllı 
Aşağıdolay
Aşağıoba 
Babahaki  
Bademli 
Baharlı 
Bahçe 
Bakacak 
Balcılar 
Bayındır 
Başhan 
Başköy 
Başören 
Belli 
Boyacı 
Bozçalı 
Bölümlü 
Derbent
Diktepe
Doruk
Eliaçık
Erler
Gedikbaşı
Göksu
Gültepe
Güngeçti 
Güroluk
Güzelköy
Harmanlı
Hasanpınar
Işıklar
Kamberli
Kamışlı
Karabörk
Karacık
Karagöz
Karapınar
Karatepe
Karayiğit
Karaçölya 
Kavuşak
Kayıköy
Kazancı
Kağıtlı 
Keberli
Kocalar
Kopmaz 
Kopuzlu
Korukçu 
Koyunlu
Koğuk
Kumrulu
Kurudere
Kurudeğirmen
Köprüköy
Köseli
Kılavuztepe 
Merdan  
Meydanlık 
Mirzabey  
Obalı
Ofköy  
Oğuzlar
Pınarbaşı
Sarıköy
Sarıtoprak 
Sazlı
Seki
Serçeler
Sinanköy
Tatlıçayır  
Tepe
Tepecik
Tilkilik
Topraklı
Türkmenhacı  
Ulutürk 
Uyanık
Uğrak
Uğurlu
Yamaçköy
Yasince 
Yağmurköy
Yenice
Yukarıdolay  
Yukarıharım  
Yukarısalat  
Çakallı
Çakıllı
Çatalköy
Çavuşlu
Çeltikli
Çölağan  
Çöltepe  
Üçtepe
İsalı
İsapınar 
Şahintepe

Notable people
Özz Nûjen, comedian born in Bismil who later moved to Sweden
Mehmet Mehdi Eker, former Minister of Food, Agriculture and Livestock
Azize Tanrıkulu, Turkish taekwondo athlete

References

Kurdish settlements in Turkey
Populated places in Diyarbakır Province
Populated places on the Tigris River
Districts of Diyarbakır Province